Mary Jermyn Heseltine (1910–2002) was an Australian pathologist "and an early and forceful proponent of the adoption and use in Australia of the Pap smear for detecting cervical cancer."

Early life
Heseltine attended Church of England Girls' Grammar School, Ballarat from 1921 until 1927 before she graduated from PLC Melbourne and the University of Melbourne (MD 1954).  She went to the Cornell University Medical School in 1955 to study cytology with George Papanicolaou who invented the Pap smear. When she returned to Australia, she began the first gynaecological cytology unit in Australia at the King George V Memorial Hospital.

References

1910 births
2002 deaths
Australian pathologists
University of Melbourne alumni doctors
People educated at the Presbyterian Ladies' College, Melbourne
Women pathologists
20th-century Australian medical doctors
21st-century Australian medical doctors
Place of birth missing